Wayne-Westland Community Schools is a school district headquartered in Westland, Michigan in Metro Detroit.

The district service area includes all and/or portions of Westland, Wayne, Canton, Dearborn Heights, Inkster, and Romulus. As of 2012 the district had 12,600 students.

During the summer of 2013, the Inkster Public Schools District was dissolved. The Wayne-Westland school district absorbed a portion of the Inkster District. Students north of Michigan Avenue and west of Middlebelt were rezoned to Wayne-Westland. As of July 2013, there were 65 registered students, including 34 elementary students, 13 middle school students, and 18 high school students, in Inkster Public Schools who lived within that part of the former Inkster district assigned to Wayne-Westland.

Schools

High Schools
9-12th grade

Zoned
 John Glenn High School (Westland)
 Wayne Memorial High School (Wayne)
Alternative
 William D. Ford Career/Technical Center
 Wayne-Westland Innovative Academy  (formerly Tinkham Alternative Education)

Middle Schools 
6-8th grade
 Franklin Middle School (Wayne)
 Stevenson Middle School (Westland)
 Adams Middle School (Westland)

Elementary Schools
K-5th grade
 Edison (Westland)
 Elliott (Westland)
 Graham (Westland)
 Hamilton (Westland)
 Hicks (Inkster)
 Roosevelt-McGrath (Wayne)
 Schweitzer (Westland)
 Taft-Galloway (Wayne)
 Walker-Winter (Canton)
 Wildwood (Westland)

Early Childhood/Preschool
 Stottlemyer (Westland)

Former schools

Elementary schools:
 Cady, 121 North Wayne Road, (Westland)
 Cleveland, 34300 Palmer Road (Westland)
 Hoover, 5400 4th Street (Wayne)
 Horace Mann, 4150 Hubbard (Wayne)
 Jackson, 4426 South Venoy
 Jefferson/Barns, 32150 Dorsey (Westland)
 Kettering (Westland)
 Lincoln, 33800 Grand Traverse (Westland)
 Madison, 1075 Carlson (Westland)
 McKee, Cowan (Westland)
 Monroe, 5021 Biddle (Wayne)
 Norris, 31627 Palmer Road (Westland)
 Patchin, 6420 North Newburg Road (Westland)
 Sheldon, 45081 Geddes (Canton Twp)
 Tinkham (Westland)
 Titus (Westland)
 Tonquish Warren Rd (Westland)
 Vandenberg, 32101 Stellwagen (Wayne)
 Woodrow Wilson, 1225 Wildwood (Westland)
 Washington, 35026 Glenwood (Westland)

Junior High Schools:
 Westside 3712 Williams (Wayne)
 Southside 33415 Myrtle (Wayne)
 Northside 3101 Fourth Street (Wayne)
 Nankin Mills Cowan (Westland)
 Marshall 35100 Bayview (Westland)

References

External links

 Wayne-Westland Community Schools
 School district map (post-2013) - Michigan Center for Geographic Information.
 School district map (pre-2013) - By Shively, J. Michigan Center for Geographic Information, Michigan Department of Information Technology. March 2008.

Education in Wayne County, Michigan
School districts in Michigan
Dearborn Heights, Michigan
Canton, Michigan
Inkster, Michigan
Romulus, Michigan
Westland, Michigan